Odrin Cove is the 10 km wide bay indenting for 7 km Nordenskjöld Coast in Graham Land, Antarctica, and entered southwest of Fothergill Point and northeast of Spoluka Point. Its head is fed by Zaychar Glacier, Sinion Glacier, Akaga Glacier and the glacier featuring Arrol Icefall.

The bay is named after the settlements of Odrintsi in Northeastern and Southern Bulgaria.

Location
British mapping in 1978.

Maps
 British Antarctic Territory.  Scale 1:200000 topographic map.  DOS 610 Series, Sheet W 64 60.  Directorate of Overseas Surveys, UK, 1978.
 Antarctic Digital Database (ADD). Scale 1:250000 topographic map of Antarctica. Scientific Committee on Antarctic Research (SCAR), 1993–2016.

References
 Odrin Bay. SCAR Composite Antarctic Gazetteer.
 Bulgarian Antarctic Gazetteer. Antarctic Place-names Commission. (details in Bulgarian, basic data in English)

External links
 Odrin Bay. Copernix satellite image

Bays of Graham Land
Bulgaria and the Antarctic
Nordenskjöld Coast